Fahmi Said Rajab Nasib Bait Durbin (born 10 October 1993) is an Omani professional footballer who plays as a defender for Omani club Al-Nasr Salalah and the Oman national team.

International career 
Durbin was included in the Oman final-23 squad for the 2021 FIFA Arab Cup on 18 November 2021. On 3 December 2021, he scored an own-goal against Qatar in a 2–1 defeat.

International goals

References

External links
 

1993 births
Living people
People from Salalah
Omani footballers
Association football defenders
Al-Nasr SC (Salalah) players
Oman Professional League players
Oman youth international footballers
Oman international footballers